Alfonso Dal Pozzo Farnese or Thomas Pozzi (1582 – 25 August 1626) was a Roman Catholic prelate who served as Bishop of Borgo San Donnino (1620–1626).

Biography
Alfonso Pozzi was born in Piacenza, Italy in 1582.
On 30 March 1620, he was appointed during the papacy of Pope Paul V as Bishop of Borgo San Donnino.
On 5 April 1620, he was consecrated bishop by Roberto Ubaldini, Bishop of Montepulciano, with Galeazzo Sanvitale, Archbishop Emeritus of Bari-Canosa, with Orazio Mattei, Bishop of Gerace, serving as co-consecrators. 
He served as Borgo San Donnino until his death on 25 August 1626.

References

External links and additional sources
 (for Chronology of Bishops) 
 (for Chronology of Bishops) 

17th-century Italian Roman Catholic bishops
Bishops appointed by Pope Paul V
1582 births
1626 deaths